Montreal is the largest city in Quebec, Canada.

Montréal or Montreal may also refer to:

Places

Canada
Island of Montreal, an island in the province of Quebec
Greater Montreal, the metropolitan area of Montreal
Montréal (region), an administrative region and statistical area in the province of Quebec
Montreal Metropolitan Community, a supra-municipal level of government
Montreal Agglomeration Council, a supra-municipal level of government
Montreal Urban Community, a former supra-municipal level of government
Montreal River, Ontario, a municipality
Montreal River (Algoma–Sudbury, Ontario)
Montreal River (Timiskaming District)
Montreal River (Saskatchewan)
Montreal Lake (Saskatchewan)
Montreal Island (Nunavut)

France
Château de Montréal, Dordogne
Montréal, Ardèche
Montréal, Aude
Montréal, Gers
Montréal, Yonne
Montréal-la-Cluse, Ain
Montréal-les-Sources, Drôme
Villeneuve-lès-Montréal, Aude

Jordan
Montréal (Crusader castle)
Lordship of Montréal or Oultrejordain

Spain
Montreal, Catalonia

United Kingdom
Montreal Park, a park where Geoffrey Amherst had his residence

United States
Montreal, Missouri
Montreal, Wisconsin
Montreal River (Michigan)
Montreal River (Wisconsin-Michigan)

Ships
 HMCS Montreal (K319), a River-class frigate in service 1943 to 1945
 HMCS Montréal (FFH 336), a Halifax-class frigate commissioned in 1994
 French frigate Montréal
 HMS Montreal (1761), a 32-gun fifth rate
 HMS Montreal (1813), a 20-gun sloop

Foods
Montreal-style smoked meat
Montreal-style bagel
Montreal steak seasoning
Montreal hot dog
Montreal melon

International Agreements and Declarations
Declaration of Montreal, a declaration of LGBT rights
Montreal Protocol, a 1987 treaty to protect the ozone layer
Montreal Convention (disambiguation)

Other uses
Alfa Romeo Montreal, a car
Montreal Canadiens, a hockey team
of Montreal, a band
"Montreal", a 2011 song by The Weeknd from Echoes of Silence
Montreal Metro (disambiguation)
Montreal Cognitive Assessment - a cognitive test

See also
HMCS Montreal, a list of ships
HMS Montreal, a list of ships
Montrealer (train), a former Amtrak passenger train service, now the Vermonter
Montreuil (disambiguation)
Montreux (disambiguation)
Mount Royal (disambiguation)
Monreale, Italy
Monte Real, Portugal
Réalmont, France
Realmonte, Italy